Jorge L. Richardson Osorio (born February 11, 1976) is a retired male track and field athlete, who competed in the sprints events during his career. He competed for his native country at the 2000 Summer Olympics, where he was eliminated in the first round of the men's 4x100 metres relay, alongside Osvaldo Nieves, Rogelio Pizarro and Félix Omar Fernández. Richardson ran the third leg in the race.

International competitions

References
sports-reference

1976 births
Living people
Puerto Rican male sprinters
Athletes (track and field) at the 2000 Summer Olympics
Olympic track and field athletes of Puerto Rico